The 104th Aviation Regiment is an aviation regiment of the U.S. Army, primarily provided by the Army National Guard.

Both battalions of the regiment are part of the Combat Aviation Brigade, 28th Infantry Division. The 1st Battalion is an attack helicopter battalion of the Pennsylvania Army National Guard.

The 2d Battalion, 104th Aviation Regiment was formed in October, 1990 at Fort Indiantown Gap as an assault helicopter battalion. The 2nd Battalion exchanged its Bell UH-1 Hueys (as an aviation battalion) for Sikorsky UH-60 Blackhawks (as a general support aviation battalion) in 2002.

Structure
 1st Battalion 
 Company C (WV ARNG)
 2d Battalion (General Support)
 Headquarters and Headquarters Company
 Detachment 2 (CT ARNG), Aviation Support Facility, Windsor Locks, Connecticut 
 Detachment 3 (WV ARNG) 
 Company A (UH-60)
 Company B (CH-47F) at Army Aviation Support Facility at Bradley International Airport (CT ARNG)
 Detachment 1 (CT ARNG), Aviation Support Facility, Windsor Locks, Connecticut
 Company C (UH-60L/HH-60M) at Army Aviation Support Facility #1, Mid-Ohio Valley Regional Airport (WV ARNG)
 Company D (Engineering)
 Detachment 2 (CT ARNG), Windsor Locks, Connecticut
 Detachment 3 (WV ARNG)
 Company E
 Detachment 2 (CT ARNG), Windsor Locks, Connecticut
 Detachment 3 (WV ARNG)
 Company G (UH-60L) at Army Aviation Support Facility #1 at Lincoln Airport (NE ARNG).
 Detachment 2

References

104